Pandolfi may refer to:

Alberto Pandolfi, Peruvian politician
Claudia Pandolfi,  Italian actress
Elio Pandolfi,  Italian actor
Emile Pandolfi, American pianist
Fernando Pandolfi, Argentine footballer
Filippo Maria Pandolfi, Italian politician
Giovanni Antonio Pandolfi (c. 1540-c. 1581), Italian painter
Giovanni Antonio Pandolfi [Mealli] (1624-1687), Italian composer
Giovanni Giacomo Pandolfi (1567-1636), Italian painter
Jono Pandolfi, American ceramicist
Nicholas Pandolfi, English actor
Pier Paolo Pandolfi, Italian-American research geneticist

Italian-language surnames

it:Pandolfi